Helmut Möckel may refer to:

Helmut Möckel (politician) (1909–1945), German politician
Helmut Möckel (footballer) (born 1921), German footballer